Gurpreet Singh Banawali is an Indian politician and the MLA representing the Sardulgarh Assembly constituency in the Punjab Legislative Assembly. He is a member of the Aam Aadmi Party.  He was elected as the MLA in the 2022 Punjab Legislative Assembly election.

Member of Legislative Assembly
The Aam Aadmi Party gained a strong 79% majority in the sixteenth Punjab Legislative Assembly by winning 92 out of 117 seats in the 2022 Punjab Legislative Assembly election. MP Bhagwant Mann was sworn in as Chief Minister on 16 March 2022.
Committee assignments of Punjab Legislative Assembly
Chairman (2022–23) Committee on Agriculture and its allied activities

Electoral performance

References 

Living people
Punjab, India MLAs 2022–2027
People from Mansa district, India
Aam Aadmi Party politicians from Punjab, India
Year of birth missing (living people)